Subedar Singh Rajodha is an Indian politician and member of the Bharatiya Janata Party. Rajodha is a member of the Madhya Pradesh Legislative Assembly from the Joura constituency in Morena district.

References 

Living people
People from Morena district
Bharatiya Janata Party politicians from Madhya Pradesh
Madhya Pradesh MLAs 2018–2023
Madhya Pradesh MLAs 2013–2018
1953 births